Yun Sang-ho is a South Korean footballer who plays for Seoul E-Land FC.

References

1992 births
Living people
South Korean footballers
K League 1 players
K League 2 players
Gwangju FC players
Incheon United FC players
Seoul E-Land FC players
Association football midfielders